The 1986 Player's International Canadian Open was a tennis tournament played on outdoor hard courts. The men's tournament was held at the National Tennis Centre in Toronto, Ontario, and was part of the 1986 Nabisco Grand Prix while the women's tournament was held at the Jarry Park Stadium in Montreal, Quebec, and was part of the 1986 Virginia Slims World Championship Series. The men's tournament was held from August 11 through August 17, 1986, while the women's tournament was held from August 18 through August 24, 1986.

Finals

Men's singles

 Boris Becker defeated  Stefan Edberg 6–4, 3–6, 6–3
 It was Becker's 4th title of the year and the 8th of his career.

Women's singles
 Helena Suková defeated  Pam Shriver 6–2, 7–5
 It was Suková's 8th title of the year and the 20th of her career.

Men's doubles
 Chip Hooper /  Mike Leach defeated  Boris Becker /  Slobodan Živojinović 6–7, 6–3, 6–3
 It was Hooper's 2nd title of the year and the 4th of his career. It was Leach's 1st title of the year and the 1st of his career.

Women's doubles
 Zina Garrison /  Gabriela Sabatini defeated  Pam Shriver /  Helena Suková 7–6, 5–7, 6–4
 It was Garrison's 3rd title of the year and the 6th of her career. It was Sabatini's 2nd title of the year and the 5th of her career.

See also
 Becker–Edberg rivalry

References

External links
 
 Association of Tennis Professionals (ATP) tournament profile
 Women's Tennis Association (WTA) tournament profile

Player's Canadian Open
Player's Canadian Open
Player's Canadian Open
Canadian Open (tennis)